The Peris Horseshoe is an annual fell running race in Snowdonia, Wales. The race starts and finishes in Llanberis and has a distance of approximately 28 km and 2590 m of ascent. It is usually run in September. The event is organised by Eryri Harriers. It was first held in 1987, when it was organised by Arthur Clarke.

There is also a shorter Half Peris race, finishing at Pen-y-Pass, which is held in conjunction with the Horseshoe.

Course
Starting from Llanberis, the course heads out from the Slate Museum through the disused slate quarry. The first summit is that of Elidir Fawr followed by Y Garn and Glyder Fawr. The course descends to Pen-y-Pass to cross the A4086 road, then ascends via the Miners track to Lliwedd and via the Watkin Path to the summit of Snowdon. The course joins the Snowdon Ranger Path and then ascends Moel Cynghirion and returns to Llanberis beside Dolbadarn Castle.

Winners

The fastest men's time is 3:02:49 set by Gavin Bland in 1994. The event was one of the counting races in the British Fell Running Championships that year. The quickest women's time is 3:28:14 by Menna Angharad in 1996, when the race was also a championship counter. Angharad's performance has been considered to be one of the strongest female course records in fell running.

Note 1: Race shortened.

References

Fell running competitions
Athletics competitions in Wales
Sport in Gwynedd